The Sebeș Formation is a geological formation in Romania. It is of Maastrichtian age. It is laterally equivalent to the Sard Formation. The base of the formation consists of claystones interbedded with sandstones and conglomerates. It is well known for its fossils which form a component of the Hațeg Island fauna.

Paleobiota

Turtles

Dinosaurs

Pterosaurs

References 

Geologic formations of Romania
Upper Cretaceous Series of Europe
Maastrichtian Stage